Erinella may refer to:
 Erinella (bryozoan), a fossil genus of bryozoans in the family Cellariidae
 Erinella (fungus), a genus of funguses in the family Hyaloscyphaceae
 Erinella, a genus of funguses in the family Lachnaceae, synonym of Lachnum